Strathmore Silverbacks are a Scottish rugby league team, part of Strathmore RFC, based in Forfar, Angus. They play in the Scottish National League. Their home ground is Inchmacoble Park.

History 
The Silverbacks were formed in 2015 by former rugby league professional and Scotland A internationals David Vernon, and Stuart Gray of Strathmore RFC. In their debut 2015 season under head coach Vernon they won the Edinburgh 9s and finished runner-up to champions Aberdeen Warriors, even beating the champs twice, including in their last game of the season 39-32. The following season saw them once again finish runner-up to the Warriors in the league and in the Grand Final played at Montrose they were beaten 32-48. In 2017 the Silverbacks were crowned Scottish Champions after a quality 32-30 victory over Edinburgh Eagles in Edinburgh, earning the right to represent Scotland in the 2018 Challenge Cup.

Internationals 
Despite their short history the club has already produced some Scottish internationals. In September 2015 Murray Mitchell was called up to the Scotland U19s for their match against Cumbria. The following year in July three players Ewan Maguire, Jack Wilson and Darren Bell played in the Scotland U19s defeat to England U19s at Post Office Road, Featherstone. In 2017 Niall Hall was called up to the Scotland students train on squad in preparation for the end of season World Cup in Australia. in November 2017 Murray Mitchell, Niall Hall and Ali Olivier were selected for the Scotland Under 23 team for the Commonwealth 9s in February 2018.

Honours 
 Edinburgh 9s (1): 2015
 Strathmore 9s Runners-Up (1): 2016
 Scotland 9s  (1): 2017
Scottish Cup Runners-Up (1): 2019
 Scottish Runners-Up (3): 2015, 2016, 2018, 2021
 Scottish Champions (2): 2017, 2019

See also

Rugby league in Scotland
List of rugby league clubs in Britain

References

External links 

Scottish rugby league teams
2015 establishments in Scotland
Rugby clubs established in 2015
Forfar
Sport in Angus, Scotland